Route 201 is a collector road in the Canadian province of Nova Scotia.

It is located in the Annapolis Valley and runs from Annapolis Royal to Kingston. Heading west from its junction with Trunk 1 the route follows the southern banks of the Annapolis River through the communities of Nictaux, Lawrencetown, and Paradise before crossing over Highway 101 into the town Bridgetown. After exiting the town the route continues west where it terminates at a junction with Route 8 in the town of Annapolis Royal.

The highway is designated as a bicycle route.

Communities
Lequille 
Moschelle 
Round Hill 
Tupperville 
Centrelea
Carleton Corner
West Paradise 
Paradise
Lawrencetown
South Williamston
Nictaux West
Nictaux
South Farmington
Meadowvale
Greenwood
South Greenwood
Greenwood Square
East Kingston

Roads
Trunk 8

Parks
 Annapolis Royal Historic Gardens 
 Bloody Creek National Historic Site

See also
List of Nova Scotia provincial highways

References

201
201
201
Middleton, Nova Scotia